The Caucasian wildcat (Felis silvestris caucasica) is a European wildcat subspecies that inhabits the Caucasus Mountains and Turkey.

Taxonomy
Felis silvestris caucasica was described by Konstantin Satunin in 1905 on the basis of a skin of a female cat collected near Borjomi in Georgia.

Felis silvestris trapezia was proposed in 1916 for a male zoological specimen in the collection of the Natural History Museum, London, which originated in the vicinity of Trabzon in northern Turkey.

Characteristics
The Caucasian wildcat differs from the European wildcat by being lighter gray in colour, with a fainter pattern on the sides and the tail.

Distribution and habitat 
In Turkey, the wildcat is considered common in mesic and mixed oak-beech forests of the Pontic Mountains, but rare in the Marmara and Aegean Sea regions. In the Taurus Mountains, it probably only occurs in deciduous forest of Kahramanmaraş Province. It is possibly extinct in the Eastern Anatolia Region.

References 

Wildcats
European wildcat subspecies
Mammals described in 1905
Mammals of Turkey
Fauna of Georgia (country)
Mammals of Azerbaijan
Fauna of Armenia